Crystal Spring is an unincorporated community in Brush Creek Township, Fulton County, Pennsylvania, United States, south of Breezewood. Just to the west, across the county line in Bedford County, is Gapsville.

The elevation is approximately 1161 feet.

References

Unincorporated communities in Fulton County, Pennsylvania
Unincorporated communities in Pennsylvania